Mount Backus is a summit in Alberta, Canada.

Mount Backus has the name of a pioneer settler.

References

One-thousanders of Alberta
Canadian Rockies